The T2 Tunnel, officially Marinos Antypas–Rigas Feraios Tunnel is a  highway twin tunnel on the Motorway 1 in Greece. It is the longest road tunnel in South-east Europe. It was built for the motorway to bypass the Vale of Tempe, which was traversed by the very narrow and dangerous Greek National Road 1. 

Construction of the T2 Tunnel began in August 2008, along with a  section of the motorway, but both projects were slowed in 2010–11 by the country's economic crisis. Construction resumed in 2014 and was completed in April 2017, along with the Evangelismos-Skotina section of the motorway.

See also 
 Motorway 1 (Greece)

References

Larissa
Road tunnels in Greece
Tunnels completed in 2017